ORP Wilk was a Foxtrot-class submarine, in service with the Polish Navy from 1987 to 2003. It was originally commissioned into the Soviet Navy in 1963. The boat travelled 47000 nautical miles and dived 626 times.

References 

Foxtrot-class submarines
1963 ships